Grapsus adscensionis is a species of crab found in the eastern Atlantic Ocean.

Distribution
Grapsus adscensionis is found in parts of the Atlantic coast of Africa and in several groups of Atlantic islands such as Macaronesia, Saint Helena, Ascension Island, São Tomé and Príncipe and Fernando de Noronha.

References

Grapsidae
Crabs of the Atlantic Ocean
Crustaceans described in 1765
Taxa named by Pehr Osbeck